The discography of 8Ball & MJG, an American hip hop duo, consists of eight studio albums, one mixtape and ten singles.

Albums

Studio albums

Compilation albums

Live albums

Mixtapes

8Ball albums

8Ball mixtapes

MJG albums

MJG mixtapes

Singles

Guest appearances

8Ball & MJG

8Ball

MJG

References

Discographies of American artists
Hip hop discographies